Events in the year 1922 in Spain.

Incumbents
Monarch: Alfonso XIII
President of the Council of Ministers: 
 until 8 March: Antonio Maura
 8 March-7 December: José Sánchez-Guerra y Martínez
 starting 7 December: Manuel García Prieto

Births
26 December - José María Rodero, actor (died 1991).

Deaths
22 January - Enrique Almaraz y Santos, Cardinal Archbishop of Seville (born 1847).

References

 
Years of the 20th century in Spain
1920s in Spain
Spain
Spain